Zubaida Yazdani (27 April 1916 – 11 June 1996) was an Indian historian specializing in the history of the Deccan Plateau and the Nizam State of Hyderabad in India. She studied History at Oxford and was a contemporary of Mrs Indira Gandhi, Prime Minister of India.

Biography 

Zubaida Yazdani was born in Hyderabad, India on 27th April 1916. Yazdani was one of the first Asian women to enter Oxford University. She authored two books and numerous scholarly articles about the history of India. Her book Hyderabad During the Residency of Henry Russell, 1811–1820  was a scholarly exposition of the Indian Subsidiary Alliance system. A second book, The Seventh Nizam: The Fallen Empire, was a memoir of the last Nizam of Hyderabad and also a study of the constitutional and political complexities which surrounded the relations of the Indian states with the British Raj. Her scholarship explores the topics based on the painstaking use of original records, documents that had been overlooked by previous investigators. Deeply archival, Yazdani's scholarship challenged of conventional histories.   

Yazdani also supervised the translation of Nazir Ahmad Dehlvi's novel Taubat-Al-Nusuh (English: Repentance Of Nussooh: The Tale Of A Muslim Family A Hundred Years Ago) from Urdu into English. This is an important literary work of the late 19th century on the life of Muslims in India.  

Yazdani taught for more than three decades in college in Hyderabad, India, where she was one of the main founders of a college for women. She also started the Hyderabad School for Languages and Science in London, teaching primary, junior and secondary pupils in Urdu as well as the curriculum subjects of English, mathematics, computer studies, French, and Arabic to students from primary to O and A Levels.

Personal life 

Yazdani was the oldest daughter of Ghulam Yazdani, D.Litt. who was himself an eminent historian and archaeologist. He is considered an authority on the history of the Deccan and had numerous publications about the history of south India. He was the director of archaeology in the Nizam's government in Hyderabad and was instrumental in the preservation of the caves at Ajanta and Ellora which are masterpieces of Buddhist and Hindu religious art. He was awarded an OBE by the British government and a Padma Bhushan (India's third highest civilian honour) by the Indian government. Zubaida Yazdani was married to Mir Yaseen Ali Khan, who was an accomplished Urdu poet and published in the leading literary magazines of India.

Zubaida Yazdani passed her senior Cambridge exams with high marks from Mahboobia School. Her father recognized her talents and came with her to Britain at his own expense so she could sit for the Oxford university entrance examination. Zubaida Yazdani travelled to Oxford in 1935 and sat the entrance exam for St. Hilda's college; after interviews, she was accepted. She wrote in her own words that the students "came mostly from the British middle classes and aristocracy ... not only academically the cream of English society but in their manners ... very humble and living ... paid great respect to their tutors".

Zubaida Yazdani was one of the first Asian women to enter Oxford University and was a contemporary of Indira Gandhi (late prime minister of India). Her own example gave an incentive for other Hyderabadi students to come to Oxford for higher studies. When asked many years later during an interview about her memories of Indira Gandhi, Zubaida Yazdani commented that "She was a very shy student. She spoke little in lectures and discussions."

Zubaida Yazdani got her degree at Oxford in June 1940. After the outbreak of World War II, she was determined to stay on and do postgraduate studies at Oxford. In her own words:

"Students pursued normal courses, contented themselves with lunches of cheese sandwiches and apples, and used the shelters only when the sirens sounded."

She was asked by her family to come back because of the dangers the war presented.

The Suez Canal had closed by that time, and it would have been exceedingly dangerous to go back via that route as the war raged on in Europe and the Middle East. So she had to go to India via the US. She had to travel to the US from Britain across the Atlantic in a ship which dodged German U Boats which patrolled the Atlantic and sank 175 allied warships and 3500 merchant ships. She arrived back on the east coast of India in Calcutta after a perilous journey of nearly three months via New York, San Francisco and Hong Kong. Her overjoyed parents went from Hyderabad to Calcutta to receive her.

On her return home to Hyderabad she was appointed lecturer (1942) and then reader (1947) in history at the Women's College, Osmania university. She started M.A. classes there. She taught there for many years and also conducted and published research while teaching there.

Zubaida Yazdani, however, had a great desire to pursue postgraduate education. Indian teaching staff with more than ten years of service were allowed two years leave with full pay. She left for Britain in March 1963 and started attending postgraduate classes at London university School of Oriental and African Studies and later transferred to Oxford University, where she completed her postgraduate studies at St. Hilda's College.

From 1967 to 1969 she was senior reader at the Women's college, Osmania University, and was also its acting principal. Then she became reader in history at the Arts college, Osmania University, and finally head of its history department.

Zubaida Yazdani retired in 1976 and came to Britain with her husband, Mir Yaseen Ali Khan, because two of her sons, Hussain and Hassan, were already residents in Britain. She then wrote (with Mary Crystal) her second book, The Seventh Nizam: The Fallen Empire.

Zubaida Yazdani died in London on 11 June 1996.

Scholarly and literary work 

Zubaida Yazdani published her first book "Hyderabad during the Residency of Henry Russell 1811 – 1820". The book was based on her B.Litt. thesis at Oxford university. It was a scholarly work based on original sources which were available at the Bodleian Library at Oxford which housed the Russell and Palmer papers. She was the first to make a detailed study of these voluminous papers. Rushbrook Williams (CBE, FRSA), who was a fellow of All Souls College, Oxford wrote in the preface to the book that the study breaks new ground and enforces the revision of hitherto accepted judgments and is an unbiased and thorough investigation of the subject.

Zubaida Yazdani published her second book titled "The Seventh Nizam: The Fallen Empire" in 1985. The book is a study of Hyderabad under the Seventh Nizam (1911–48), the greatest of the Asaf Jahi rulers of Hyderabad. It also embraces a study of the British government's policies towards the Indian states. It also shows the effects of the two world wars on British policy up to the time when India and Pakistan became independent. The book was a scholarly work based on original papers that were obtained from the India Office library in London as well as original papers of the Nizam that were made available to her by the Nizam's family. Many of these papers have never been studied before this book was published. The book painstakingly document's the source of all materials and provides voluminous references.

The preface for the book was written by Gordon Johnson (Director of the Cambridge University Centre for South Asian Studies and President of the Royal Asiatic Society of Great Britain and Ireland (2015–18)) who wrote that not only does the study chronicle the live of the last Nizam but also the complexities of the relationship of the Indian States with the British raj which is an often ignored aspect of Indian history. Dr. Gordon wrote that the study thus contributes to our understanding of modern political developments in the sub-continent.

Zubaida Yazdani also supervised the translation from Urdu into English, of a novel titled Taubat al Nusuh written by Nazir Ahmad Dehlvi who was the first Urdu novelist. Nazir Ahmed was a contemporary of Sir Syed Ahmad Khan and was concerned with the reform and education of Muslims particularly Muslim women. Taubat al Nusuh is considered by many to be the first novel written in Urdu.

Zubaida Yazdani also wrote numerous papers and articles which were presented at scholarly conferences.

Social and educational work 

Zubaida Yazdani was always involved in social and educational work in particular for the benefit of the underprivileged. However her work in the establishment of a women's college stands out. While Zubaida Yazdani was working as a Reader in history at the Women's college, Osmania university she noticed that because of the increased number of women seeking admission, the underprivileged women were finding it difficult to get admission to the existing women's colleges. 

A branch of the Federation of University Women was established at Hyderabad, under the name of the University Women's Cultural Association and she was appointed its Secretary. Zubaida Yazdani presented her proposal for the establishment of a new women's college to the Association and the proposal was accepted by Sri Devi the principal of the Women's College who highly encouraged the project. However the association was concerned about the lack of resources for such an undertaking because not a rupee was available for this proposal. Zubaida Yazdani went door to door to raise funds from wealthy individuals and businesses. She was also able to get teachers to agree to teach in the college with the condition that for the first year they would only receive Rupees 20 to Rupees 25 per month. This was an extremely low salary for teachers in those days. 

There was also no building for the proposed college. So she approached Sultan Bazar library because their buildings were empty all day and the administration of the library agreed to let the college use their buildings temporarily. Then the college was started with an initial enrollment of about 35 students[10]. An incident that occurred during this time speaks to the unshakable determination and dedication of Zubaida Yazdani. The Sultan Bazaar library eventually wanted their rooms back and decided to make the college leave by locking the doors to the building. They would not listen to any requests from the college. Zubaida Yazdani faced this crisis in her usual determined way. She told the students to go home and that it was a college holiday for them and to come back to the same place the next day and they would be informed of the college's new location. She also told the teachers to come back the next day at their usual time and they would then go to the new premises. The teachers were astonished because there weren't any new buildings to move to.  She then went home and took her teenaged son with her and took him with her and went to meet the President and Secretary of the Sir Nizamat Jung Trust library. She requested that the halls and rooms of the library be rented out to the college. The President and Secretary of the library announced the forming of a committee and then we will let you know their decision. Zubaida Yazdani told them that by the time the committee is formed the college will be finished. The President and Secretary then asked her more questions about the college. They were so impressed by her determination and dedication and also that she was not about to take no for an answer that they gave her the keys to the halls and rooms the same day. The next day when the students and teachers came back to the college, they were met by a smiling Zubaida Yazdani who gave them directions to the new college building. Eventually the college moved to a more permanent location.  Under her leadership the college started arts classes in history, economics and sociology for underprivileged girls. Then science classes were started and a library and laboratory were set up, with very satisfactory results. Zubaida Yazdani wanted that the college should be affiliated with Osmania university. One lakh rupees (Rs. 100,000) were needed for the proposal.  The Osmania university graduates association office bearer Rai Shankar Ji took the fully functional college under the sponsorship of the Association. And in 1961, despite opposition, the U.W.C.A. college was affiliated to Osmania University. It is now, under its Hindi name, Sarojini Naidu Vanitha Maha Vidyalaya, one of the largest women's colleges in Telangana state. It is located in Nampally area of Hyderabad.

Zubaida Yazdani's son Hussain Ali Khan who as a child was often her companion on fund raising trips wrote the following about her, "About the founding of the college for women; she felt the need for such an Institution as there were not adequate places and opportunities for women whom she believed strongly in. When she made up her mind about something she felt strongly about, there was no stopping her and there was no word like NO in her dictionary of life. In the days of old it was not the IN thing for women to go to rich or powerful men's houses or see them personally on their own so I being a very young teenaged son used to accompany her on these missions of gathering funds for the cause from powerful bankers, heads of companies, directors etc. As the occasion demanded her charisma and powers of persuasion at convincing the great and the good were like magic and they were like putty in her hands and it was extraordinary to watch".

Zubaida Yazdani also established the Hyderabad School for Languages and Sciences in Hackney in London. The school was started in February 1981 because she had been approached by parents of children from Hyderabad and Pakistan to teach Urdu. She and her husband, Mir Yaseen Ali Khan, initially taught the classes, but after a few months the Inner London Education Authority visited the school and awarded a grant. After that the school was able to employ more teachers. The school taught primary, junior and secondary pupils in Urdu up the O and A level. The school also taught English, Arabic, and Science subjects. The school closed some years after Zubaida Yazdanis death.

Zubaida Yazdani was also an office bearer in various Urdu and History associations and published research in academic journals

Books

 Hyderabad during the Residency of Henry Russell 1811 – 1820
 Seventh Nizam, The Fallen Empire

References 

20th-century Indian historians
1916 births
1996 deaths
Historians of India
Indian women historians
20th-century Indian women writers
20th-century Indian writers
Women from Hyderabad State
People from Hyderabad State
Women scientists from Delhi
Women writers from Delhi
Urdu-language writers
Educators from Delhi
Women educators from Delhi